Mario Cimadevilla (born March 9, 1954 in Trelew) is an Argentine politician who served as a national senator for Chubut Province from 2009 to 2015. He is a member of the Radical Civic Union.

References

External links
 Official site 

Members of the Argentine Senate for Chubut
Radical Civic Union politicians
People from Trelew
Living people
1954 births